Africa is the world's second largest continent.

Africa may also refer to:

Arts and entertainment

Film and television
 Africa (1930 film), an American animated short featuring Oswald the Lucky Rabbit
 África (film), 1996 Spanish film
 Africa (2011 film), an Iranian crime drama
 Africa (2019 film), an Israeli drama
 Africa (1984 TV series), a Channel 4 documentary series
 Africa (2013 TV series), a BBC documentary series

Music

Classical music
"Africa" (William Billings), an 18th-century hymn tune
 "Africa", an 1891 fantasia by Camille Saint-Saëns
Africa (Still), a 1930 symphonic poem

Albums 
Africa (Miriam Makeba album), a 1991 compilation album
Africa (Perpetuum Jazzile album), 2009
Africa (Pharoah Sanders album), 1987

Songs 
"Africa" (Toto song), 1982, also covered by Weezer
"Africa" (Karl Wolf song), 2007, based on the Toto song
"Africa" (Rose Laurens song), 1982, also released as "Africa (Voodoo Master)"
 "Africa", by D'Angelo from his 2000 album Voodoo
 "Africa", by E-Type from his 2001 album Euro IV Ever
 "Africa", by Hall & O
tes from their 1980 album Voices
 "Africa", by The Knack from their 1981 album Round Trip
 "Africa", by The Meters from their 1974 album Rejuvenation
 "Hollywood (Africa)", a cover by the Red Hot Chili Peppers, 1985
 "Africa", by Yemi Alade from her 2016 album Mama Africa
 "Africa", by Toto Cutugno, on which the1975 song "L'Été indien (Africa)" was based 
 "Africa" (Lost Fields song), 2019

Other uses in arts and entertainment
 Africa (Petrarch), a 14th-century epic poem 
 Africa (journal), an academic journal
 Africa, an academic journal from Italy

Places
 Africa (Roman province), a province of the Roman Empire 
Kingdom of Africa
 Africa, Indiana, U.S.
 Africa, Ohio, U.S.

Other uses
 Africa (goddess)
 Africa (surname), including a list of people with the name
 1193 Africa, an asteroid
 Honda Africa Twin, a motorcycle
 HMS Africa, the name of several ships 
 Africa Safari Adventure Park, in Costa Rica

See also

 Afrika (disambiguation)
 Africa '70 (disambiguation)
 Africa U.S.A. (disambiguation)
 African Union, a union of African states
 Africatown, a historic community in Mobile, Alabama, U.S.
 Ifriqiya, the area in medieval history of today's eastern Algeria, Tunisia and western Libya
 Republic of New Afrika, an American black nationalist and separatist organization
 Scipio Africanus (disambiguation)